The 1955–56 season was the 76th season of competitive football in England.

Overview
Defending league champions Chelsea decided not to compete in the new European Champions Cup, following opposition from the Football League about the participation of English clubs in the competition.

The league title is taken by a Manchester United side with an average age of just 22, which finished an incredible 11 points ahead of their nearest contenders, Blackpool and Wolverhampton Wanderers.

It was a Manchester double for trophies, with Manchester City winning the FA Cup, with goalkeeper Bert Trautmann famously playing on despite suffering what was later diagnosed as a broken neck in a collision with a Birmingham City player.

Honours

Notes = Number in parentheses is the times that club has won that honour. * indicates new record for competition

Awards
Football Writers' Association
 Footballer of the Year – Bert Trautmann (Manchester City)
Top goalscorer
 Nat Lofthouse (Bolton Wanderers), 33

Football League

First Division
Manchester United won the First Division title by 11 points, featuring a squad of players with an average age of just 22, with manager Matt Busby's emphasis on youth paying dividends and answering the critics who felt that his policy would not be able to maintain United's place among the game's elite. Second place was occupied by Blackpool, with Stanley Matthews still a dominant presence in the team in his 41st year, while Wolves finished third, FA Cup winners Manchester City finished fourth, and Arsenal completed the top five. Birmingham City finished sixth to record their best ever final position.

Second Division
Sheffield Wednesday crossed paths with their cross city rivals to return to the First Division by winning the Second Division title, joined by runners-up Leeds United. Liverpool narrowly missed out on a First Division comeback by finishing third.

Third Division North

Third Division South

Top goalscorers

First Division
Nat Lofthouse (Bolton Wanderers) – 32 goals

Second Division
Willie Gardiner (Leicester City) – 34 goals

Third Division North
Bob Crosbie (Grimsby Town) – 36 goals

Third Division South
Sammy Collins (Torquay United) – 40 goals

References